Karlheinz Martin (May 6, 1886 – January 13, 1948) was a German stage and film director, best known for his expressionist productions.

After enjoying success with experimental productions in Frankfurt am Main and Hamburg, Martin went to Berlin, where he premiered Ernst Toller's anti-war drama, Transfiguration (Die Wandlung) on September 30, 1919. Performed in a hall seating fewer than 300 spectators, the production used the intimacy of the space to drive home the horrors of Toller's script. The sets were jagged flats placed against blackness, and lit with harsh white spotlights. Scenes ended in blackouts not, as was customary at the time, with the curtain falling. Fritz Kortner became famous for his intense portrayal of the young hero. 

Martin turned to film in 1920, when he directed a cinematic adaptation of one of the most celebrated expressionist dramas, Georg Kaiser's From Morn to Midnight (Von morgens bis mitternachts) with actor Ernst Deutsch as the Cashier who embezzles money from a bank and goes on a desperate search for meaning in his life in a nightmarish metropolis. 

After World War II, Martin revived Bertolt Brecht's The Threepenny Opera in Berlin, and
premiered Georg Kaiser's pacifist drama, The Soldier Tanaka (Der Soldat Tanaka).

Selected filmography
From Morn to Midnight (1920)
The House on the Moon (1921)
The Pearl of the Orient (1921)
 Punks Arrives from America (1935)
The Voice of the Heart (1937)

Further reading
Michael Patterson. The Revolution in German Theatre: 1900-1933. (Boston: Routledge and Kegan Paul, 1981).

External links

Film people from Freiburg im Breisgau
1886 births
1948 deaths